Carpostalagma chalybeata is a moth of the subfamily Arctiinae. It was described by George Talbot in 1929. It is found in the Democratic Republic of the Congo,
Rwanda, and South Africa.

References

Erebid moths of Africa
Moths described in 1929
Arctiini